Andesiana is a genus representing its own family Andesianidae and superfamily Andesianoidea, the "Andean endemic moths". It contains three species with a wingspan up to 5.4 cm. in female A. similis and 3.5 cm. in males. This far surpasses in size any previously known monotrysian moth. These large Microlepidoptera are restricted to Andean South America, from where they were described originally in 1989 in the family Cossidae by their discoverer Patricia Gentili.

Systematics
The vein "R2" in the hindwing is two-branched, suggesting that the family Andesianidae is basal to the superfamily Nepticulidae, but the way the wings are coupled suggests it had a later origination within the Monotrysia, where it can be placed based on characters of the female reproductive system. The relationships of Andesiana with representatives of other lepidopteran superfamilies is currently under investigation using DNA sequences .

Morphology and identification
The labial palpi have an elongated second segment, the
tibia of the male hindleg has a "hairpencil" contained in a pouch on the femur, and the antennae are "bipectinate" in the male and "filiform" in the female; the proboscis is much reduced.

Distribution
The genus is found in Nothofagus forests of Andean Chile and Argentina.

References

Nomenclatural notes
Lepindex  accessed March 2007 incorrectly places the species "neurotenes Turner 1932" from Queensland in the genus "Andesiana, Gentili, 1986" of which the database suggests Archaeoses Turner, 1932 (a cossid )is a junior subjective synonym. Presumably this is not to be confused with an Oecophoridae moth of the same name neurotenes described by Turner in the genus Antiopala in 1939 and currently placed in the genus Prepalla 

Andesianidae
Andesianidae of South America
Fauna of the Andes
Monotrysia genera